The 1995 Southern Conference baseball tournament was held at College Park in Charleston, South Carolina, from April 27 through 30. Top seeded The Citadel won the tournament and earned the Southern Conference's automatic bid to the 1995 NCAA Division I baseball tournament. It was the Bulldogs second consecutive tournament win and third overall.

The tournament used a double-elimination format. Only the top eight teams participate, so Furman was not in the field as Marshall owned the tiebreaker.

Seeding

Bracket

All-Tournament Team

References 

Tournament
Southern Conference Baseball Tournament
Southern Conference baseball tournament
Southern Conference baseball tournament